The Colt Walker, sometimes known as the Walker Colt, is a single-action revolver with a revolving cylinder holding six charges of black powder behind six bullets (typically .44 caliber lead balls). It was designed in 1846 by American firearms inventor Samuel Colt to the specifications of Captain Samuel Hamilton Walker.

History

The Colt Walker was created in the mid-1840s in a collaboration between Texas Ranger Captain Samuel Hamilton Walker (1817–1847) and American firearms inventor Samuel Colt (1814–1862), building upon the earlier Colt Paterson design. Walker wanted a handgun that was extremely powerful at close range.

Samuel Walker carried two of his namesake revolvers in the Mexican–American War. He was killed in battle the same year his famous handgun was invented, 1847, shortly after he had received them. Only 1,100 of these guns were originally made, 1,000 as part of a military contract and an additional 100 for the civilian market, making original Colt Walker revolvers extremely rare and expensive to acquire. On October 9, 2008, one specimen that had been handed down from a Mexican War veteran was sold at auction for US$920,000. As reported in America's 1st Freedom magazine in July 2018, a Model 1847 Colt Walker pistol – the only known surviving example complete with its original case – was sold by Rock Island Auction for a record price of $1.84 million. This makes this the most expensive single firearm ever sold at auction.

The Republic of Texas had been the major purchaser of the early Paterson Holster Pistol (No. 5 model), a five shot cal .36 revolver, and Samuel Walker became familiar with it during his service as a Texas Ranger. In 1847, Walker was engaged in the Mexican–American War as a captain in the United States Mounted Rifles. He approached Colt, requesting a large revolver to replace the single-shot Model 1842 Percussion Pistols then in use. The desired .44–.45 caliber revolver would be carried in saddle mounted holsters. The Colt Walker was used in the Mexican–American War and on the Texas frontier.

Medical officer John "Rip" Ford took a special interest in the Walkers when they arrived at Veracruz. He obtained two examples for himself and is the primary source for information about their performance during the war and afterward. His observation that the revolver would carry as far and strike with the same or greater force than the .54 caliber Mississippi Rifle seems to have been based on a single observation of a Mexican soldier hit at a distance of well over one hundred yards.

Specifications

It weighs  unloaded, has a  barrel, and fires a .44 caliber ( diameter) conical and round ball. The initial contract called for 1,000 of the revolvers and accoutrements. Colt commissioned Eli Whitney to fill the contract and produced an extra 100 revolvers for private sales and promotional gifts. Notable recipients include John Coffee Hays.

Colt commissioned New York engraver Waterman Ormsby to etch a scene on the cylinder that was based on Walker's description of the 1844 battle.

Problems
In addition to its large size and weight, problems with the Walker included ruptured cylinders after firing. This has been attributed to primitive metallurgy, soldiers allowing powder to spill across the mouths of the chambers, and even loading the original conical bullets backwards into the chambers. Under 300 of the original 1,000 were returned for repair due to a ruptured cylinder. Lard was loaded into the mouths of the cylinders on top of each bullet after loading to prevent the spark from igniting all chambers at once, a practice which continues to this day among black-powder revolver shooters, and although each chamber held 60 grains of powder, Colt recommended no more than 50 grains in each.

The Walker had an inadequate loading lever catch that often allowed the loading lever to drop during recoil, preventing fast follow-up shots. Period-correct fixes for this often included placing a rawhide loop around both the barrel and loading lever, to prevent the loading lever from dropping under recoil and locking the action.

Legacy
The Whitneyville-Hartford Dragoon is known as the first transitional model from the Walker to the Dragoon series, as it was largely built from leftover Walker parts. Subsequent contracts beginning in 1848 followed, for what is today known among collectors as the First, Second and Third Dragoon Models that were all based on the Colt Walker, enabling a rapid evolution of the basic revolver design. These improvements included shorter  barrels, shorter chambers, typically loaded only to 50 grains instead of 60 grains, thereby reducing the occurrence of ruptured cylinders, and the addition of an improved catch at the end of the loading lever to prevent the dropping of the loading lever under recoil.

The black powder Colt Walker is regarded as the most powerful commercially manufactured repeating handgun from 1847 until the introduction of the .357 Magnum in 1935, having a muzzle energy nearly exactly the same as a  handgun firing a .357 Magnum. Taking into account its muzzle velocity and energy produced, it currently still holds the record for the most powerful handgun ever issued by the US military. The Colt Walker has long maintained a unique position and mystique among handgun users, and its name is often used as a common expression of any overly large generic handgun example. 

Modern replicas chambered in the .45 Black Powder Magnum wildcat cartridge have been offered by the Colt Blackpowder shop, Cimarron Firearms, Armi San Marco, and Uberti Firearms.

In popular culture 

On May 23, 2021, Texas Governor Greg Abbott signed a resolution naming the 1847 Colt Walker pistol the official handgun of Texas.

References

Further reading

External links
 The Colt Revolver in the American West—Walker Model
 The 1847 Colt Walker: The Most Powerful Handgun Ever Used by The U.S. Military

Colt revolvers
Single-action revolvers
Black-powder pistols
Early revolvers
Guns of the American West
Weapons of the Confederate States of America
Symbols of Texas